Timber Lake (Lakota: blečháŋ; "Tree Lake") is a city in and the county seat of Dewey County, South Dakota, United States. The population was 509 at the 2020 census.

History
Timber Lake was founded in 1910 with the arrival of the Chicago, Milwaukee, St. Paul and Pacific Railroad into the area. Despite the name, very few trees grew at the lake near the town site. During drought, the lake is a mere mudhole.

Geography and climate
Timber Lake is located at  (45.428682, -101.074606).

Timber Lake has been assigned the ZIP code 57656 and the FIPS place code 63629.

Demographics

2010 census
As of the census of 2010, there were 443 people, 179 households, and 110 families residing in the city. The racial makeup of the city was 51.5% White, 43.1% Native American, and 5.4% from two or more races. Hispanic or Latino of any race were 0.05% of the population.

There were 179 households, of which 33.5% had children under the age of 18 living with them, 44.7% were married couples living together, 10.1% had a female householder with no husband present, 6.7% had a male householder with no wife present, and 38.5% were non-families. 34.6% of all households were made up of individuals, and 16.2% had someone living alone who was 65 years of age or older. The average household size was 2.47 and the average family size was 3.15.

The median age in the city was 34.5 years. 29.6% of residents were under the age of 18; 5.6% were between the ages of 18 and 24; 25.8% were from 25 to 44; 22.8% were from 45 to 64; and 16.3% were 65 years of age or older. The gender makeup of the city was 49.2% male and 50.8% female.

2000 census
As of the census of 2000, there were 443 people, 183 households, and 120 families residing in the city. The population density was 1,086.8 people per square mile (417.2/km2). There were 207 housing units at an average density of 507.8 per square mile (194.9/km2). The racial makeup of the city was 60.72% White, 36.34% Native American, 1.13% Asian, and 1.81% from two or more races.

There were 183 households, out of which 29.0% had children under the age of 18 living with them, 50.8% were married couples living together, 9.8% had a female householder with no husband present, and 34.4% were non-families. 31.1% of all households were made up of individuals, and 18.0% had someone living alone who was 65 years of age or older. The average household size was 2.42 and the average family size was 3.03.

In the city, the population was spread out, with 28.2% under the age of 18, 9.0% from 18 to 24, 22.3% from 25 to 44, 21.7% from 45 to 64, and 18.7% who were 65 years of age or older. The median age was 37 years. For every 100 females, there were 93.4 males. For every 100 females age 18 and over, there were 91.6 males.

The median income for a household in the city was $27,500, and the median income for a family was $28,000. Males had a median income of $23,750 versus $20,625 for females. The per capita income for the city was $12,047. About 20.8% of families and 23.3% of the population were below the poverty line, including 26.8% of those under age 18 and 19.1% of those age 65 or over.

Media
 The Timber Lake Topic is the local newspaper.

See also
 List of cities in South Dakota

References

External links

 

Cities in Dewey County, South Dakota
Cities in South Dakota
County seats in South Dakota
Populated places established in 1911
1911 establishments in South Dakota